Klosterbach is a river of Baden-Württemberg and Bavaria, Germany. It is left a tributary of the Danube near Schwenningen.

One of its tributaries is the Nebel (German Nebelbach), which played a tactical role in the Battle of Blenheim and is often mentioned in accounts of that battle.

See also
List of rivers of Bavaria

References

Rivers of Baden-Württemberg
Rivers of Bavaria
Rivers of Germany